Tomasz Witold Drwal (born January 22, 1982) is a Polish professional mixed martial artist and boxer who most recently competed in the Middleweight division of KSW. A professional competitor since 2004, Drwal has also competed for the UFC.

Mixed martial arts career

Ultimate Fighting Championship
Drwal lost his UFC debut against Thiago Silva at UFC 75 on September 8, 2007.

Drwal returned to action after knee surgery at UFC 93 in January 2009 and defeated the debuting Ivan Serati via KO in the first round.

Drwal next fight was a first-round TKO over Mike Ciesnolevicz on the TUF 9 Finale on June 20, 2009 (a replacement for injured Eric Schafer).

Moving down to Middleweight, Drwal defeated Drew McFedries at UFC 103 in the second round by rear-naked choke submission.

Drwal faced Rousimar Palhares on March 27, 2010 at UFC 111, losing after an early slip via heel hook submission which appeared to injure Drwal. Palhares was subsequently suspended for 90 days for continuing to apply pressure to the lock after the referee intervened.

Drwal then fought David Branch on September 15, 2010 at UFC Fight Night 22. Drwal was initially set to fight Nick Catone who had to withdraw from the fight due to injury. He lost the fight via unanimous decision. Following two subsequent losses, Drwal was released from his UFC contract.

Post-UFC
Drwal returned to his winning ways knocking out Leonardo Lucio Nascimento at FAŁ 2 in his native Poland. His next fights were for new Polish promotion called MMA Attack, in which to this point he had two fights, against Gary Padilla and Wes Swofford, and all of them he won, respectively by unanimous decision and submission via armbar in 1st round.

Tomasz faced Łukasz Bieńkowski at KSW 53: Reborn. He won the fight via second round TKO.

Drwal faced Patrik Kincl on December 19, 2020 at KSW 57: De Fries vs. Kita. He lost the fight after getting knocked unconscious at the end of round 1.

Professional boxing
Drwal made his professional boxing debut on November 4, 2017 against Brazilian MMA fighter Luiz Abdalla in a 194 lbs bout. Drwal won via knockout.

Championships and accomplishments
Ultimate Fighting Championship
Knockout of the Night (One time) vs. Mike Ciesnolevicz

Mixed martial arts record

|-
|Loss
|align=center| 22–6–1
|Patrik Kincl
|KO (punch)
|KSW 57: De Fries vs. Kita
|
|align=center|1
|align=center| 4:22
|Łódź, Poland
|
|-
|Win
|align=center| 22–5–1
|Łukasz Bieńkowski
|TKO (punches)
|KSW 53: Reborn
| 
|align=center|2
|align=center|2:34
|Warsaw, Poland
|
|-
|Loss
|align=center| 21–5–1
|Michał Materla
| TKO (punches)
|KSW 31: Materla vs. Drwal
| 
|align=center|3
|align=center|4:56
| Gdańsk, Poland
|For the KSW Middleweight Championship.
|-
| Win
|align=center| 21–4–1
| Delson Heleno
| KO (punch)
| Pro MMA Challenge 1: Drwal vs. Heleno
| 
|align=center| 1
|align=center| 4:03
| Wroclaw, Poland
|
|-
| Win
|align=center| 20–4–1
|  Wes Swofford
| Submission (armbar)
| MMA Attack 3
| 
|align=center| 1
|align=center| 3:00
| Katowice, Poland
|
|-
| Win
|align=center| 19–4–1
|  Gary Padilla
| Decision (unanimous)
| MMA Attack
| 
|align=center| 2
|align=center| 5:00
| Warsaw, Poland
| 
|-
| Win
|align=center| 18–4–1
|  Leonardo Lucio Nascimento
| KO (punches)
| Fighters Arena Łódź 2
| 
|align=center| 2
|align=center| 3:37
| Łódź, Poland
| 
|-
| Loss
|align=center| 17–4–1
|  David Branch
| Decision (unanimous)
| UFC Fight Night: Marquardt vs. Palhares
| 
|align=center| 3
|align=center| 5:00
| Austin, Texas, United States
| 
|-
| Loss
|align=center| 17–3–1
|  Rousimar Palhares
| Submission (heel hook)
| UFC 111
| 
|align=center| 1
|align=center| 0:45
| Newark, New Jersey, United States
| 
|-
| Win
|align=center| 17–2–1
|  Drew McFedries
| Submission (rear-naked choke)
| UFC 103
| 
|align=center| 2
|align=center| 1:03
| Dallas, Texas, United States
| 
|-
| Win
|align=center| 16–2–1
|  Mike Ciesnolevicz
| TKO (knee and punches)
| The Ultimate Fighter 9 Finale
| 
|align=center| 1
|align=center| 4:48
| Las Vegas, Nevada, United States
| 
|-
| Win
|align=center| 15–2–1
|  Ivan Serati
| KO (punches)
| UFC 93
| 
|align=center| 1
|align=center| 2:02
| Dublin, Ireland
| 
|-
| Loss
|align=center| 14–2–1
|  Thiago Silva
| TKO (punches)
| UFC 75
| 
|align=center| 2
|align=center| 4:23
| London, England
| 
|-
| Win
|align=center| 14–1–1
|  Andre Fyeet
| Submission (rear-naked choke)
| Fight Club Berlin 9
| 
|align=center| 1
|align=center| 3:22
| Berlin, Germany
| 
|-
| Win
|align=center| 13–1–1
| Valdas Pocevicius
| TKO (punches)
| World Full Contact Association: Grand Prix 2007
| 
|align=center| 1
|align=center| N/A
| Riga, Latvia
| 
|-
| Win
|align=center| 12–1–1
|  Lucio Linhares
| TKO (punches)
| The Cage: Volume 4
| 
|align=center| 1
|align=center| 3:32
| Helsinki, Finland
| 
|-
| Win
|align=center| 11–1–1
| Pavel Nohynek
| KO
| Fight Club Berlin 6
| 
|align=center| 1
|align=center| 2:03
| Berlin, Germany
| 
|-
| Win
|align=center| 10–1–1
|  Nordin Asrih
| KO
| Budo Freefight System: Mix Fight Gala 5
| 
|align=center| 1
|align=center| N/A
| Düsseldorf, Germany
| 
|-
| Win
|align=center| 9–1–1
|  Denis Juskevic
| KO
| Outsider Cup: Freefight Romania
| 
|align=center| 1
|align=center| N/A
| Romania
| 
|-
| Win
|align=center| 8–1–1
|  Martin Kubes
| TKO
| Fight Club Berlin 5
| 
|align=center| N/A
|align=center| N/A
| Berlin, Germany
| 
|-
| Win
|align=center| 7–1–1
|  Przemysław Tomczyk
| Submission (triangle armbar)
| MMA Sport 1
| 
|align=center| 1
|align=center| 1:24
| Warsaw, Poland
| 
|-
| Win
|align=center| 6–1–1
|  Michael Knaap
| Submission (choke)
| Budo Freefight System: Mix Fight Gala 4
| 
|align=center| 2
|align=center| N/A
| Düsseldorf, Germany
| 
|-
| Win
|align=center| 5–1–1
|  Ulf Fritzmann
| Submission (strikes)
| Fight Club Berlin 4
| 
|align=center| 1
|align=center| N/A
| Berlin, Germany
| 
|-
| Win
|align=center| 4–1–1
|  Jacek Buczko
| Decision
| Colosseum 3
| 
|align=center| 2
|align=center| 5:00
| Bielsko-Biała, Poland
| 
|-
| Win
|align=center| 3–1–1
|  Krzysztof Gołaszewski
| Decision
| Colosseum 3
| 
|align=center| 2
|align=center| 5:00
| Bielsko-Biała, Poland
| 
|-
| Win
|align=center| 2–1–1
|  Sławomir Zakrzewski
| TKO (punches)
| Colosseum 3
| 
|align=center| 1
|align=center| 1:36
| Bielsko-Biała, Poland
| 
|-
| Loss
|align=center| 1–1–1
|  Ulf Fritzmann
| Submission
| Fight Club Berlin 3
| 
|align=center| 1
|align=center| N/A
| Berlin, Germany
| 
|-
| Win
|align=center| 1–0–1
|  Daniel Les
| TKO (punches)
| Colosseum 1
| 
|align=center| 1
|align=center| 2:15
| Bielsko-Biała, Poland
| 
|-
| Draw
|align=center| 0–0–1
|  Piotr Baginski
| Draw
| Berserkers Arena 2
| 
|align=center| 1
|align=center| 30:00
| Szczecin, Poland
|

See also
 List of current KSW fighters
List of male mixed martial artists

References

External links

1982 births
Living people
Polish male mixed martial artists
Middleweight mixed martial artists
Light heavyweight mixed martial artists
Mixed martial artists utilizing boxing
Mixed martial artists utilizing Brazilian jiu-jitsu
Polish practitioners of Brazilian jiu-jitsu
Sportspeople from Nowy Sącz
Ultimate Fighting Championship male fighters
Polish male boxers